Islam Abdelkader  (born ) is an Egyptian male volleyball player. He was part of the Egypt men's national volleyball team at the 2014 FIVB Volleyball Men's World Championship in Poland. He played for El-Gaish.

Clubs
 El-Gaish (2014)

References

1994 births
Living people
Egyptian men's volleyball players
Place of birth missing (living people)